The 4th Destroyer Squadron was a naval unit of the Royal Navy from 1951 to 1959.

Overview
After World War II, the British Navy reverted to its previous layout and command structure in 1950 the 4th Destroyer Flotilla of the Home Fleet was disbanded  and succeeded by the 4th Destroyer Squadron.  The Admiralty controlled global deployment of the navy until 1964 when that department was abolished and replaced by the new Navy Department, Ministry of Defence.  These geographic commands usually comprised fleets, squadrons, flotillas, and single ships. In 1954, major re-structuring of the composition of the navy was undertaken, leading to downsizing and warships being rotated between the various fleets and stations.  In 1954 and 1971, many of these commands were abolished or amalgamated into larger geographic commands. In November 1971, nearly all British naval forces were brought under the command of a single fleet whose headquarters was at Northwood, Middlesex then under the control of Commander-in-Chief Fleet. In 2012, that post was abolished and replaced by the Fleet Commander who now operated from Navy Command Headquarters in Portsmouth, Hampshire.

Organizational changes
Note: Command structure organizational changes took place within Royal Navy post war period the term Flotilla was previously applied to a tactical unit until 1951 which led to the creation of three specific Flag Officers, Flotillas responsible for the Eastern, Home and Mediterranean fleets the existing destroyer flotillas were re-organized now as administrative squadrons.

Deployments
Included:

Composition
Included:

, Mediterranean Fleet 1951
4th Destroyer Squadron
 HMS Agincourt (Leader)
 HMS Corunna
 HMS Gabbard replaced by HMS Aisne (1951)
 HMS St. James replaced by HMS Jutland (1951)
, Mediterranean Fleet 1952
4th Destroyer Squadron
 HMS Agincourt (Leader)
 HMS Aisne
 HMS Corunna
 HMS Jutland
, Home Fleet 1953
4th Destroyer Squadron
 HMS Agincourt (Leader)
 HMS Aisne
 HMS Corunna 
 HMS Jutland
, Home Fleet 1954
4th Destroyer Squadron
 HMS Agincourt (Leader)
 HMS Aisne
 HMS Barrosa
 HMS Corunna 
, Home Fleet 1955
4th Destroyer Squadron
 HMS Agincourt (Leader)
 HMS Aisne
 HMS Barrosa
 HMS Corunna 
, Mediterranean 1956
4th Destroyer Squadron
 HMS Agincourt (Leader)
 HMS Aisne
 HMS Barrosa
 HMS Corunna 
, Mediterranean 1957
4th Destroyer Squadron
 HMS Agincourt (Leader)
 HMS Alamein
 HMS Barrosa
 HMS Corunna 
, Home Fleet 1958
4th Destroyer Squadron
 HMS Agincourt (Leader)
 HMS Alamein
 HMS Barrosa
 HMS Corunna 
, Home Fleet 1959
4th Destroyer Squadron
 HMS Agincourt (Leader)
 HMS Alamein
 HMS Barrosa
 HMS Corunna

Squadron commander
Included:

See also
 List of squadrons and flotillas of the Royal Navy

References

Sources
 Mackie. Colin (2017). Senior Royal Navy Appointments from 1865: Gulabin. http://www.gulabin.com/.
 Smith. Gordon and Watson, Graham. Dr. (2015) The Royal Navy, post 1945. Royal Navy Organisation and Ship Deployments 1947-2013. http://www.naval-history.net.

External links

Destroyer squadrons of the Royal Navy